Amalda borshengi is a species of sea snail, a marine gastropod mollusc in the family Ancillariidae, the olives.

Description

Distribution

References

borshengi
Gastropods described in 2002